Ian Gaynair (born February 26, 1986) is a Belizean professional defender currently playing for Belmopan Bandits.

In July 2013 he, and fellow international Woodrow West, were praised by CONCACAF for reporting an attempt to bribe them ahead of a Gold Cup game against the USA.

Gaynair's goal against the US was Belize's only score of the tournament; it was also his first international goal.

International goals 
Scores and results list Belize's goal tally first.

References

External links
 
 Instagram: @iangaynair7

1986 births
Living people
Belize international footballers
Belizean footballers
Premier League of Belize players
2007 UNCAF Nations Cup players
2009 UNCAF Nations Cup players
2011 Copa Centroamericana players
2013 Copa Centroamericana players
2013 CONCACAF Gold Cup players
2014 Copa Centroamericana players
2017 Copa Centroamericana players

Association football defenders
Belmopan Bandits players